Lamine N'Diaye (born 18 October 1956) is a Senegalese football coach and former player who is the manager of Guinean club Horoya AC.

Playing career
Born in Thiès, N'Diaye played as a midfielder for US Rail, SC Orange, Cannes and Mulhouse, and also represented the Senegalese national side at international level.

Coaching career
N'Diaye briefly managed Mulhouse in 1998. N'Diaye later managed Cameroonian club side Coton Sport from 2003 to 2006. N'Diaye became coach of the Senegal national team in January 2008, following the resignation of Henryk Kasperczak. He was fired from his position as manager in October 2008. N'Diaye was appointed manager of Moroccan side Maghreb Fez in December 2008, before becoming manager of TP Mazembe in September 2010. He became technical director of TP Mazembe in May 2013. In December 2014 he became technical director of AC Léopards. By July 2018 he was manager of Sudanese club Al-Hilal. In November 2019 he became manager of Guinean club Horoya AC.

References

1956 births
Living people
Sportspeople from Thiès
Association football midfielders
Senegalese footballers
Senegal international footballers
1992 African Cup of Nations players
US Rail players
AS Cannes players
FC Mulhouse players
Ligue 1 players
Ligue 2 players
FC Mulhouse managers
Senegalese expatriate footballers
Senegalese expatriate sportspeople in France
Expatriate footballers in France
Expatriate football managers in France
1990 African Cup of Nations players
Senegal national football team managers
TP Mazembe managers
Linafoot managers
2008 Africa Cup of Nations managers
Al-Hilal Club (Omdurman) managers
Senegalese football managers
Senegalese expatriate football managers
Senegalese expatriate sportspeople in Cameroon
Expatriate football managers in Cameroon
Senegalese expatriate sportspeople in the Democratic Republic of the Congo
Expatriate football managers in the Democratic Republic of the Congo
Senegalese expatriate sportspeople in the Republic of the Congo
Expatriate football managers in the Republic of the Congo
Senegalese expatriate sportspeople in Sudan
Expatriate football managers in Sudan
Senegalese expatriate sportspeople in Guinea
Expatriate football managers in Guinea
Senegalese expatriate sportspeople in Morocco
Expatriate football managers in Morocco
Coton Sport FC de Garoua managers
Maghreb de Fès managers
Horoya AC managers